Arambagh also known as Arambag is a town and a municipality in Hooghly district  in the state of West Bengal, India. It is the headquarters of Arambagh subdivision.

Geography

Location
It has an average elevation of 15 metres (118 feet). The town is situated on the link Road (state highway-2) 81Km  north-west of Kolkata, 27 Km north-west of Tarakeswar, 39 Km south-east of Bardhaman. It is located on the bank of the Dwarakeswar River.

Area overview
The Arambagh subdivision, presented in the map alongside, is divided into two physiographic parts – the Dwarakeswar River being the dividing line. The western part is upland and rocky – it is extension of the terrain of neighbouring Bankura district. The eastern part is flat alluvial plain area.  The railways, the roads and flood-control measures have had an impact on the area. The area is overwhelmingly rural with 94.77% of the population living in rural areas and 5.23% of the population living in urban areas.

Note: The map alongside presents some of the notable locations in the subdivision. All places marked in the map are linked in the larger full screen map.

Climate
The maximum temperature during summer rises up to 42 °C (2016)  while minimum temperature during winter comes down to 8 °C. Average annual rainfall is 1600 millimetres.

Demographics
According to the 2011 Census of India, Arambagh had a total population of 66,175 of which 33,443 (51%) were males and 32,732 (49%) were females. Population in the age range 0–6 years was 6,522. The total number of literate  persons in Arambagh was 48,338 (81.03% of the population over 6 years).

 India census, Arambagh had a population of 66,175. Males constitute 62% of the population and females 38%. Arambagh has an average literacy rate of 82%, higher than the national average of 59.5%; with 79% male literacy and 58% of female literacy. 17% of the population is under 6 years of age.

Civic administration

Police station
Arambagh police station has jurisdiction over Arambagh municipal area and Arambagh CD block. The headquarters of Arambagh CD block are located at Arambagh.

Economics
This is a rice and potato agricultural area with several rice mills and cold storages. Many Top branded companies set up their business in Arambagh.

History

Arambagh sub-division was formed in 1879. It was known as Jahanabad Sub-Division as the headquarters of the sub-division was the town of Jahanabad.Bankim Chandra Chattopadhyay was the first Sub-Divisional Officer of Arambagh. On 19 April 1900 the name  was changed from Jahanabad to Arambagh, which means "the garden of ease and comfort". Other prominent figures from the district were:
 Rammohan Roy – Reformer. He was Ambassador of Mughal Emperor.
 Prafulla Chandra Sen – Freedom fighter, Chief Minister of W.B.
 Ramkrishna Parmahnsa - Indian Hindu mystic and saint during the 19th century Bengal. Kamarpukur was his birthplace. 
 Prasanna Kumar Sarbadhikary – First Patiganit (arithmetic book in Bengali) writer. 
 Nandlal Maity - Writer of history of mathematics in Bengali in three volume.
 Narayan Ch Ghosh - Defined the term Folkmathematics - mathematics that is manifestation of folk life.

Education

Libraries
Two government sponsored public libraries are situated in Arambagh. Raja Rammohan Roy Pathagar-o- Sanskriti Parishad is the oldest and most popular library of this area. Another library is Arambagh Sub Divisional library.  Besides these two, there are many other public libraries in the surrounding area.

CBSE affiliated Schools

Arambagh Vivekananda Academy (CBSE)
Jawahar Navodaya Vidyalaya, Hooghly

CISCE (ICSE/ISC) Schools 

 Sarada Vidyapith, but the school is not affiliated.
Kids Star Play School for ages 2 to 6, cares childs holistic development.

West Bengal Board affiliated schools

Pearl Rosary School is the most renowned school in the locality. The school is affiliated to WBBSE and WBCHSE. The school is an authorised study centre of National Institute of Open Schooling (NIOS), Govt of India.

Kapsit High School, Kapsit, Arambagh, Hooghly
Batanal Union High School
Arambag High School
Kalipur Swamiji High School
Pearl Rosary School
Bajua High School
Arambagh Girls High School
Kanpur Krishnabati Vivekananda Institution
Parul Ramkrishna Sarada High School
Arambagh Boys Primari School
Basanta Prathamik Vidhyalaya
K.B.Roy High School
Saraswati Sishu Mandir, Balibela
Tirol High School, Tirol
Gourhati Haradas Institution
Golta High School
Golta Nimna Buniadi Vidyalaya
Joyrampur Netaji High School
Muthadanga R.K. High School
Pirijpur Hamidannesa Vidyapith 
Bhurkunda High School (H.S)
Naisarai High School
Nirbhoy pur Badalkona Ghiya Nilkantha Sikshanikaten High School
Uttor Badalkona Prathomik Bidyaloy
Hatbasantapur Hara Parbbati Institution (H.S.)
Goghat High School (HS)
Bengai High School
Shaikhpur High School, Uttar Rasulpur, Hooghly
Karui P.C High School (H.S) Karui, arambagh, hooghly, 712615
Baradongal R N Institution (H.S), Baradongal, Hooghly, 712617
Kumursha Sital Chandra Dey Vidyamandir (H.S), Kumursha, Hooghly, 712616
Saora Union High School, Saora, hooghly
Ghoshpur Union Netaji Vidyapith, Ghoshpur, Hooghly
Gourhati Haradas Institution
Raghunathput Saradamoni Valika Vidyalaya
Ghasua Janata High School
Mayal K.C. Roy Institution
Thakuranichak Union High School
Thakuranichak BBD Institution
Dhanyaghori High School, Bandar
Ghoradaha Sudhanya Charan High School
Pole P.C.Sen High School
Bengejola High School
Ramnagar Atul Vidyalaya
Madhurpur High School
Patul Ganeshbazar High School(HS)
Radhaballavpur High School
Balarampur Primary School
Mohanpur Primary School
Khudiram Child Learning Centre (primary school)
Anandamarga School (primary school), Rabindrapally, Arambagh
Sisu Guchho (primary school)
Kashinath Primary School
Nirvoipur Primary School
Chandibati Primary School
Basudevpur Parul Jr. Basic School
Dihibayra Primary School
Haripur Sayedia Primary School
Kamarpukur Ramakrishna Mission Multipurpose School
Garh Mandaran High School
Dakshin Rasulpur High School (H.S)
Paschim Ghoshpur Ramkrishna Bidyapith (H.S)

General degree colleges
Aghorekamini Prakashchandra Mahavidyalaya, Bengai, Goghat II CD Block
Arambagh Girls' College, Arambagh
Kabikankan Mukundaram Mahavidyalaya, Keshabpur, Arambagh CD Block
Netaji Mahavidyalaya, Kalipur, Arambagh
Rabindra Mahavidyalaya, Champadanga, Pursurah
Raja Rammohan Roy Mahavidyalaya, Radhanagore, Khanakul I CD Block
Sri Ramkrishna Sarada Vidyamahapith, Kamarpukur, Goghat II CD Block

Polytechnic
ITI-Bengai,  Goghat
Arambagh Government Polytechnic, Arambagh

See also
 Arambagh Vivekananda Pally
 Muthadanga

References

Cities and towns in Hooghly district